Adrianus Sunarko O.F.M. (born 7 December 1966) is an Indonesian Roman Catholic bishop.

Biography
Although born in the Indonesian province of Papua, Sunarko's family are Javanese immigrants from Bantul, Yogyakarta.

Sunarko was educated at St. Peter Canisius Middle Seminary, in the town of Mertoyudan in Magelang Regency from 1982 to 1987. After completing his studies at the Mertoyudan Seminary, he was accepted as a candidate member of the Franciscans and underwent training as a novitiate. As part of his formation, Sunarko studied philosophy at STF Driyakarya in Jakarta. He resumed his theological studies at the Wedabhakti Pontifical Theological Faculty, Sanata Dharma University, after completing his pastoral orientation year.

On 15 August 1994, Sunarko took his solemn vows as a member of the Order of Friars Minor. The following year on 8 July 1995, he was ordained a priest by then-Cardinal Julius Darmaatmadja.

After his ordination Sunarko was the provincial head of the Franciscan friars in Indonesia, and served as a priest in the Diocese of Jayapura.

On 28 June 2017 it was announced that Sunarko had been nominated as the bishop of Pangkalpinang, succeeding Hilarius Moa Nurak who had died in April of the previous year. On 23 September of that year, Sunarko was ordained bishop of the diocese of Pangkalpinang by archbishop of Palembang, Aloysius Sudarso.

References

External links

1966 births
Living people
Javanese people
People from Merauke Regency
Franciscan bishops
21st-century Roman Catholic bishops in Indonesia
Indonesian Friars Minor